Franconia is a historical region of southern Germany.

Franconia may also refer to:

Locations

Germany
 Franconia (wine region), one of the 13 wine regions of Germany
 Gau Franconia, an administrative division of Nazi Germany

United States
 Franconia, Arizona
 Franconia, Minnesota
 Franconia, New Hampshire
 Franconia College
 Franconia Notch, a mountain pass
 Franconia Range, a mountain range adjacent to the notch
 Franconia, Ohio
 Franconia, Pennsylvania
 Franconia, Virginia
 Franconia Township, Chisago County, Minnesota
 Franconia Township, Montgomery County, Pennsylvania

People
 Conrad II of Franconia (c. 989/990–1039), Emperor of the Holy Roman Empire
 Eberhard of Franconia (c. 885–939), Duke of Franconia
 Hedwiga of Franconia (c. 850/55–903), Duchess of Saxony
 Henry of Franconia (died 886), military commander of the Carolingian Empire
 Matilda of Franconia (c. 1027–1034), daughter of Emperor Conrad II and Gisela of Swabia

Transportation

Vehicles
 RMS Franconia (1910), a Cunard liner and troopship, sunk in 1915 during World War I
 RMS Franconia (1922), a Cunard liner and troopship, retired and scrapped in 1956
 RMS Franconia (1955), a Saxonia-class ocean liner
 British Rail Class 40, a diesel locomotive D220 built by English Electric

Other
 Franconia-Springfield station, a metro rail, commuter rail, and bus station in Springfield, Virginia, United States
 Virginia State Route 644 (Fairfax County), a secondary state highway in Virginia, United States; named Franconia Road for part of the route

Other
 Franconia (hymn tune), a hymn tune by Johann Balthasar König
 Franconia (grape), an alternative name for the wine grape Blaufränkisch
 Franconia Brewing Company, a microbrewery in McKinney, Texas, U.S.
 Franconia Mennonite Conference, a regional conference of the Mennonite Church USA

See also
 Franconian (disambiguation)
 
 Francia
 Duchy of Franconia